The 2011 Valencian Community motorcycle Grand Prix was the last round of the 2011 Grand Prix motorcycle racing season. It took place on the weekend of 4–6 November 2011 at the Circuito Ricardo Tormo. It was the first race after the death of Marco Simoncelli in Sepang. It was the final race for the current formula in the premier (MotoGP) and lightweight classes (now known as Moto3).   In the premier class, the 800cc engines would be replaced by 1000cc engines.  Honda also would change motorcycles at the end of the season, as the Honda RC212V that débuted at the 2007 Qatar Grand Prix would be replaced by the RC213V for the following season. In the lightweight class, the 125cc two-stroke motorcycle formula would be replaced by 250cc four-strokes for 2012.  This was also the final race for Suzuki as a factory team until their return in 2015.

On Saturday, Stefan Bradl officially became Moto2 World Champion after his only rival, Marc Márquez, could not go on the track during the free practices and the qualifying session, because of injuries sustained in Malaysia.

MotoGP classification
Colin Edwards had an injured shoulder and was replaced by 2011 AMA Pro Superbike champion Josh Hayes on the Yamaha Tech 3 and Jorge Lorenzo was replaced for the second time by test-rider Katsuyuki Nakasuga. Loris Capirossi retired from motorcycle racing following the race.

Although Gresini Racing originally pulled out of the Valencia race after Simoncelli's fatal accident, it was later decided that the team would race. As tribute to Marco Simoncelli, Loris Capirossi, in his final MotoGP race, participated wearing Simoncelli's racing number 58 instead of his usual racing number 65, although on the official reports he was still listed as #65. All riders from MotoGP, Moto2 and the 125cc races participated in a parade lap on Sunday morning after the warm-up session with 1993 500cc World Champion Kevin Schwantz riding Simoncelli's bike. Valentino Rossi wore a tribute helmet.

The finish was one of the tightest in MotoGP history as already crowned World Champion Casey Stoner came from a long way back on acceleration out of the last corner to leapfrog Ben Spies at the finish line by just 0.015 seconds.

Moto2 classification

125 cc classification

Championship standings after the race (MotoGP)
Below are the standings for the top five riders and constructors after round eighteen has concluded.

Riders' Championship standings

Constructors' Championship standings

 Note: Only the top five positions are included for both sets of standings.

References

Valencian Community motorcycle Grand Prix
Valencian
Valencian motorcycle
21st century in Valencia
Valencian Community motorcycle Grand Prix